"Angel of Death" is the opening track on American thrash metal band Slayer's 1986 album Reign in Blood. The lyrics and music were written by guitarist Jeff Hanneman. They detail the Nazi physician Josef Mengele's  human experiments at the Auschwitz concentration camp during World War II.

"Angel of Death" led to accusations of Nazi sympathizing and racism against the band, which they vigorously denied but which followed them throughout their early career. Despite the controversy and the resulting delay in the release of Reign in Blood, the song remained a live favorite, and has appeared on all of Slayer's live albums.

The song has been described as highly influential in the development of thrash metal or speed metal, and is highly regarded by some critics; AllMusic's Steve Huey called it a classic and the album "the pinnacle of speed metal". The half-time riff was sampled by Public Enemy in their 1988 song "She Watch Channel Zero?!".

Composition and origins

Slayer guitarist Jeff Hanneman wrote "Angel of Death" after reading books about Nazi physician Josef Mengele while on tour with the band. He said that he remembered "stopping someplace where I bought two books on Mengele. I thought, 'This has gotta be some sick shit.' So when it came time to do the record, that stuff was still in my head—that's where the lyrics to 'Angel of Death' came from."

The lyrics are written both from Mengele's point of view and from that of a detached observer condemning his actions. They detail Mengele's surgical experiments on patients at the Auschwitz concentration camp during World War II. Mengele's explorations were conducted on such groups as dwarfs and twins, and included both physical and psychological examinations. Among the tests he performed that are mentioned in "Angel of Death" are experimental surgeries performed without anesthesia, transfusion of blood between twins, isolation endurance, gassing, injections with lethal germs, sex change operations, the removal of organs and limbs, and abacination.

Controversy

The lyrics of "Angel of Death" delayed the release of Reign in Blood which was originally scheduled for April 1986. The band was signed to Def Jam Records, whose distributor, Columbia Records, refused to release the album due to its subject matter and artwork, which they believed were "too graphic". Reign in Blood was eventually distributed by Geffen Records on October 7, 1986, but it did not appear on Geffen Records' official release schedule because of the controversy.

"Angel of Death" caused outrage among Holocaust survivors, as well as their families and the general public. The controversy led to accusations of Nazi sympathizing which have followed Slayer throughout their career. In 1987, Hanneman told the NME magazine:

People took Hanneman's interest in Nazi history and his collection of Nazi medals (his most prized item being a German Knight's Cross) as evidence of sympathizing. Hanneman objected, stating:
  According to guitarist Kerry King: "Yeah, 'Slayer are Nazis, fascists, Communists'—all that fun shit. And of course we got the most flak for it in Germany. I was always like, 'Read the lyrics and tell me what's offensive about it. Can you see it as a documentary, or do you think Slayer's preaching fucking World War II?' People get this thought in their heads—especially in Europe—and you'll never talk them out of it."

The song drew accusations of racism, which the band has denied. The band members are often asked about the accusations in interviews, and have stated numerous times that they do not condone racism and are merely interested in the subject.
Hanneman also wrote "SS-3", a song about senior SS commander Reinhard Heydrich, which appeared on the band's 1994 album Divine Intervention. The song "Jihad" from their 2006 album Christ Illusion has drawn comparison to "Angel of Death". "Jihad" deals with the September 11, 2001, attacks, and is told from a terrorist's perspective. Araya expected the subject matter to create a similar backlash to that of "Angel of Death", but it did not materialize—in part, he believes, due to people's view that the song is "just Slayer being Slayer".

Music and structure

At 4 minutes and 51 seconds, "Angel of Death" is the longest track on the album, which is 29 minutes in total. It is one of the most structurally conventional songs on the album, featuring prominent verses and choruses, which most of the songs eschew. Araya's vocal performance begins with a piercing, wordless scream. "[G]uitarists Kerry King and Jeff Hanneman deliver their intricate riffs [and] drummer Dave Lombardo performs some of the most powerful drumming ever recorded" at 210 beats per minute.

When drummer Lombardo left Slayer in 1992, they recruited a full-time replacement in Forbidden drummer Paul Bostaph. Bostaph made one mistake out of the nine songs the band trialled him with, on "Angel of Death". Before the "big double bass part" there is a lead section, which Bostaph could not understand, as he had to learn from live records recorded with Lombardo. Bostaph could not tell how many revolutions the guitar riff goes before the bass sequence. The band members told him there were eight, "perfecting" the song afterwards.

The song is also linguistically significant for containing the only recorded use of the word "abacinate", as mentioned in Christopher Foyle's Foyle's Philavery: A Treasury of Unusual Words.

Reception and legacy
Although "Angel of Death" did not chart, it was highly praised by critics reviewing Reign in Blood. Clay Jarvas of Stylus Magazine observed how the song "smokes the asses of any band playing fast and/or heavy today. Lyrically outlining the horrors to come, while musically laying the groundwork for the rest of the record: fast, lean and filthy." Adrien Begrand of PopMatters remarked that "There's no better song to kick things off than the masterful 'Angel of Death', one of the most monumental songs in metal history." Matthew Trzcinski, critic for Showbiz CheatSheet, rated the song as the 2nd most "horribly racist" song and criticized the band for their "dehumanizing" lyrics and approaching the subject matter with "zero sensitivity".

The song was notably sampled for use as the main riff in the 1990 song "Godlike" by industrial act KMFDM.

The same riff has been sampled by many other artists including Public Enemy for their track "She Watch Channel Zero".

"Angel of Death" was featured in the opening scene of the 2002 stunt comedy Jackass: The Movie, where Johnny Knoxville rents and modifies a car before engaging in a crash-up derby.

Personnel
 Tom Araya – bass, vocals
 Kerry King – guitars
 Jeff Hanneman – guitars
 Dave Lombardo – drums

Production
 Rick Rubin – production
 Howie Weinberg – mastering
 Andy Wallace – engineering

See also
 List of anti-war songs

References

1986 songs
Cultural depictions of Josef Mengele
Race-related controversies in music
Slayer songs
Song recordings produced by Rick Rubin
Songs about criminals
Songs about physicians
Songs about the Holocaust